The Musée national du costume de Grand-Bassam is a museum located in Ivory Coast. It is located in Grand-Bassam, Comoé District.

References

See also 
 List of museums in Ivory Coast

Museums in Ivory Coast
Buildings and structures in Comoé District
Sud-Comoé